Nizhneye Pankratovo is a rural locality (a village) in Shemogodskoye Rural Settlement, Velikoustyugsky District, Vologda Oblast, Russia. The population was 8 as of 2002.

Geography 
Nizhneye Pankratovo is located 18 km northeast of Veliky Ustyug (the district's administrative centre) by road. Aristovo is the nearest rural locality.

References 

Rural localities in Velikoustyugsky District